The 2001 Monte Carlo Masters was a men's tennis tournament played on outdoor clay courts. It was the 95th edition of the Monte Carlo Masters and was part of the Tennis Masters Series of the 2001 ATP Tour. It took place at the Monte Carlo Country Club in Roquebrune-Cap-Martin in France from 16 April through 22 April 2001.

The men's field was headlined by world No. 1 Marat Safin, Gustavo Kuerten and Magnus Norman. Other top seeds were Yevgeny Kafelnikov, Àlex Corretja, Arnaud Clément, Juan Carlos Ferrero and Tim Henman.

Finals

Singles

 Gustavo Kuerten defeated  Hicham Arazi 6–3, 6–2, 6–4
 It was Kuerten's 4th title of the year and the 21st of his career. It was his 1st Masters title of the year and his 4th overall.

Doubles

 Jonas Björkman /  Todd Woodbridge defeated  Joshua Eagle /  Andrew Florent 3–6, 6–4, 6–2
 It was Björkman's 3rd title of the year and the 28th of his career. It was Woodbridge's 2nd title of the year and the 71st of his career.

References

External links
 
 Association of Tennis Professionals (ATP) tournament profile

 
Monte Carlo Masters
Monte Carlo Masters
Monte-Carlo Masters
Monte
Monte Carlo Masters